Tobias Moers (born May 1966) is a German businessman, and was the chief executive (CEO) of Aston Martin from August 2020 to May 2022.

Moers was born in May 1966 in Freiburg. He studied mechanical engineering at the University of Applied Sciences Offenburg (Dipl.-Wirtschaftsingenieur FH).

Moers worked for Daimler AG for 26 years, rising to chairman of the management board and chief executive officer of Mercedes-AMG GmbH in October 2013.

In August 2020, Moers joined Aston Martin Lagonda as CEO. In May 2022, it was announced that Moers was stepping down as CEO with immediate effect, remaining as a consultant until end July, and that Amedeo Felisa would succeed him.

Moers has two children.

References

Living people
German chief executives
1966 births
Mercedes-Benz Group people
Businesspeople from Freiburg im Breisgau
German businesspeople in transport